The Europe/Africa Zone was one of three zones of regional competition in the 1998 Fed Cup.

Group I
Venue: La Manga Club, Murcia, Spain (outdoor clay)
Date: 14–18 April

The sixteen teams were divided into four pools of four teams. The top teams of each pool play-off in a two-round knockout stage to decide which nations progress to World Group II play-offs. The three nations winning the least rubbers were relegated to Europe/Africa Zone Group II for 1999.

Pools

Knockout stage

  and  advanced to World Group II Play-offs.
 ,  and  relegated to Group II in 1999.

Group II
Venue: Ali Bey Club, Manavgat, Turkey (outdoor clay)
Date: 5–9 May

The twenty-two teams were divided into two pools of five and six. The top teams from each pool advanced to Group I for 1999.

Pools

See also
Fed Cup structure

References

 Fed Cup Profile, Belarus
 Fed Cup Profile, Greece
 Fed Cup Profile, Slovenia
 Fed Cup Profile, Poland
 Fed Cup Profile, Portugal
 Fed Cup Profile, Great Britain
 Fed Cup Profile, South Africa
 Fed Cup Profile, Romania
 Fed Cup Profile, Latvia
 Fed Cup Profile, Sweden
 Fed Cup Profile, Ukraine
 Fed Cup Profile, Yugoslavia
 Fed Cup Profile, Denmark
 Fed Cup Profile, Lithuania
 Fed Cup Profile, Tunisia
 Fed Cup Profile, Algeria
 Fed Cup Profile, Finland
 Fed Cup Profile, Macedonia
 Fed Cup Profile, Egypt
 Fed Cup Profile, Liechtenstein
 Fed Cup Profile, Luxembourg
 Fed Cup Profile, Turkey
 Fed Cup Profile, Norway
 Fed Cup Profile, Armenia
 Fed Cup Profile, Malta
 Fed Cup Profile, Georgia
 Fed Cup Profile, Estonia
 Fed Cup Profile, Ireland
 Fed Cup Profile, Bosnia and Herzegovina
 Fed Cup Profile, Moldova

External links
 Fed Cup website

 
Europe Africa
Sport in Murcia
Tennis tournaments in Spain
Sport in Manavgat
Tennis tournaments in Turkey
Fed
Fed